CFPO-FM (95.7 FM, "95.7 Elmnt FM") is an indigenous peoples' radio station in Ottawa. Owned by First Peoples Radio, a subsidiary of the Aboriginal Peoples Television Network (APTN), it broadcasts music and talk programming targeting the First Nations community.  Music is both from mainstream and indigenous artists.

CFPO-FM has an effective radiated power (ERP) of 9,100 watts.  The transmitter is atop Tower C at Place de Ville on Queen Street at Lyon Street in Ottawa.

History 
On June 14, 2017, the CRTC awarded licences for five new Indigenous radio stations in Calgary, Edmonton, Ottawa, Toronto and Vancouver. The new stations would replace the Voices Radio network (whose licenses were revoked in 2015 due to long-term compliance issues). The Ottawa (CFPO-FM) and Toronto (CFPT-FM) licences were awarded to First Peoples Radio, a subsidiary of APTN, with the Ottawa station inheriting Voices Radio's 95.7 FM frequency.

In June 2018, it was announced that the two First Peoples Radio stations would brand as Elmnt FM, and air a mixture of music and talk programming, including pop, rock and R&B music. At least 25% of the music played by the station will be by indigenous Canadian musicians.

The station officially launched on October 24, 2018, as CFPO-FM.

The 95.7 MHz FM frequency in Ottawa was previously used by Voices Radio's CKAV-FM-9 from the 2000's until it left the air in 2014.

References

External links 

CFPO-FM History - Canadian Communications Foundation

FPO
Radio stations established in 2018
2018 establishments in Ontario
FPO